The Model K was an early relay binary adder built in 1937 by George Stibitz, a scientist at Bell Laboratories.

References 

American inventions
Calculators